The 1994 Wales rugby union tour was a series of matches played in June 1994 in Canada, Fiji, Samoa and Tonga by Wales national rugby union team.

Results
Scores and results list Wales' points tally first.

References

1994 in Oceanian rugby union
1994 rugby union tours
tour
1994
1994 in Fijian rugby union
1994
1994
1994
1994
1994 in Canadian rugby union
1994 in Tongan sport
1994 in Samoan rugby union